Oogavé is a U.S. beverage company based in Denver, Colorado.

Stephen "Esteban" Anson started making Oogavé sodas from agave nectar as an alternative to sodas with processed sugars and high fructose corn syrup. He started serving it in his Denver restaurant on April 13, 2005. With an increase in demand for the sodas, he created his own bottling plant in Denver with two friends. In January 2009, the factory was opened, and the first bottles were shipped to natural grocery stores and restaurants around Colorado. In 2014, Oogavé was purchased by Rocky Mountain Soda Company. In 2016, RMS rebranded Oogavé and created even more delicious organic agave sweetened flavors. Today, Oogavé organic sodas are available in stores and restaurants across the United States.

Flavors
 Citrus Paradisi (Sparkling Grapefruit)
 Cola Mexicana  
 Ginger Ale  
 Horchata (Vanilla Cinnamon)  
 Jamaica (Hibiscus Flower)  
 Limonada (Sparkling Lemonade)
 Mandarin Key Lime  
 Mango Tamarindo (Sweet & Sour)
 Manzana (Sparkling Apple)
 Sarsaparilla (Spiced Root Beer)
 Strawberry Rhubarb
 Watermelon Cream

External links
 Oogavé home page
 Oogavé Inventor Hopes to Cash in on Sweet Investment, by Dan England, The Greeley Tribune

Soft drinks
Drink companies of the United States
Manufacturing companies based in Denver
Food and drink companies based in Colorado